The 251 series was a DC electric multiple unit (EMU) train type operated by East Japan Railway Company (JR East) on Tokaido Main Line Super View Odoriko limited express services in Japan between April 1990 and March 2020.

Operations

Since the 13 March 2004 timetable revision, 251 series sets were also used on the weekday morning Ohayō Liner Shinjuku 26 and weekday evening Home Liner Odawara 23 services.

Formation
The four sets, numbered RE1 to RE4 and based at Ōmiya Depot in Tokyo, were formed as follows, with car 1 at the Izukyū-Shimoda end, and car 10 at the Tokyo and Shinjuku end.

Cars 4, 6, and 8 were each fitted with one PS27 scissors type pantograph.

Interior

History

Built by Kawasaki Heavy Industries and Kinki Sharyo, the first two sets were introduced from 28 April 1990. These were followed by two more sets in 1992.

The 251 series was awarded the 1991 Laurel Prize, presented annually by the Japan Railfan Club. A formal presentation ceremony was held at Shinagawa Station in Tokyo on 1 March 1992.

The fleet underwent a programme of refurbishment between December 2002 and March 2004, which included the addition of new seating, and repainting the sets into a new colour scheme.

Withdrawal
From the start of the revised timetable on 14 March 2020, the 251 series sets were replaced by new E261 series sets on services between Tokyo and Izukyu-Shimoda, with the Super View Odoriko brand being replaced by new ultra-deluxe Saphir Odoriko services. The last 251 series Super View Odoriko limited express run took place on 13 March 2020.
After their withdrawal, the trains were transferred to Nagano General Rolling Stock Center for scrapping. No 251 series cars have been preserved.

References

External links

 JR East 251 series Super View Odoriko 

Tōkaidō Main Line
Electric multiple units of Japan
East Japan Railway Company
Double-decker EMUs
Train-related introductions in 1990
1500 V DC multiple units of Japan
Kawasaki multiple units
Kinki Sharyo multiple units